Salakjit Ponsana (born 14 February 1984) is a Thai retired badminton player. She competed in the women's singles event at the 2004 Athens and 2008 Beijing Olympics. Her brother, Boonsak Ponsana is also a Thai olympian.

Career
Ponsana played badminton at the 2004 Summer Olympics, defeating Miho Tanaka of Japan in the first round but losing to Gong Ruina of China in the round of 16. In 2008, she was defeated in the second round by Zhang Ning of China with the score 23–21, 17–21, 7–21. Ponsana also competed at the Asian Games in 2002, 2006, and 2010, and won the 2010 women's team silver medal. At the Southeast Asian Games, she has collected 3 gold, 3 silver, and 3 bronze medals from 2001 to 2011. Ponsana graduated with a bachelor's degree in law from Sripatum University, and she is studying there to earn her master's in Management. She then represented her country and university to compete at the 2007 Universiade. At that games, she won a gold in team event and a bronze in mixed doubles event.

Achievements

Southeast Asian Games 
Women's singles

Summer Universiade 
Mixed doubles

Asian Junior Championships 
Girls' doubles

BWF International Challenge/Series/Asian Satellite
Women's singles

Women's doubles

Mixed doubles

 BWF International Challenge tournament
 BWF International Series tournament

References 

Salakjit Ponsana
1984 births
Living people
Salakjit Ponsana
Salakjit Ponsana
Badminton players at the 2004 Summer Olympics
Badminton players at the 2008 Summer Olympics
Salakjit Ponsana
Badminton players at the 2002 Asian Games
Badminton players at the 2006 Asian Games
Badminton players at the 2010 Asian Games
Salakjit Ponsana
Salakjit Ponsana
Asian Games medalists in badminton
Medalists at the 2002 Asian Games
Medalists at the 2010 Asian Games
Competitors at the 2001 Southeast Asian Games
Competitors at the 2003 Southeast Asian Games
Competitors at the 2005 Southeast Asian Games
Competitors at the 2007 Southeast Asian Games
Competitors at the 2009 Southeast Asian Games
Competitors at the 2011 Southeast Asian Games
Salakjit Ponsana
Salakjit Ponsana
Salakjit Ponsana
Southeast Asian Games medalists in badminton
Salakjit Ponsana
Salakjit Ponsana
Universiade medalists in badminton
Medalists at the 2007 Summer Universiade
Salakjit Ponsana
Salakjit Ponsana